Marilyn Sue Schreffler (June 14, 1945 – January 7, 1988) was an American voice actress who provided voice-overs for several animated television series, mostly for Hanna-Barbera Productions.

Biography
Marilyn Schreffler was born in Wichita, Kansas, on June 14, 1945. She graduated from Topeka West High School in 1963. She briefly attended Washburn University before moving on to Chicago and Cleveland, where she worked in several comedy groups. In the late 1960s and early 1970s, Schreffler had moved to Los Angeles and began her career doing voice-overs for animated TV programs.

Her first television voice-over roles for Hanna-Barbera were Brenda Chance on Captain Caveman and the Teen Angels and Daisy Mayhem on Scooby's All-Star Laff-A-Lympics in 1977. (For the "Laff-A-Lympics" segment, she reprised the role of Brenda from Captain Caveman and the Teen Angels which was airing concurrently). Throughout the late 1970s and 1980s, she voiced a variety of characters on other Hanna-Barbera shows such as Yogi's Space Race, Galaxy Goof-Ups, Buford and the Galloping Ghost, Fred and Barney Meet the Thing, Scooby-Doo and Scrappy-Doo, The Richie Rich/Scooby-Doo Show, The Kwicky Koala Show, The Flintstone Comedy Show, The Smurfs, Mork & Mindy/Laverne & Shirley/Fonz Hour, as well as Ruby-Spears series including Thundarr the Barbarian, Heathcliff and Dingbat, Heathcliff and Marmaduke, Alvin and the Chipmunks, Saturday Supercade and Dragon's Lair. Despite her numerous voice acting credits, Schreffler was best known as the voice of Olive Oyl on The All New Popeye Hour from 1978 to 1983, also produced by Hanna-Barbera.

Although she was a behind-the-scenes actress, Schreffler did a few on-screen acting roles on television shows in the 1980s such as Simon & Simon, Remington Steele, Airwolf and Newhart. She had voice parts in the 1987 thriller films Fatal Attraction and Jaws: The Revenge. She was also a voice in numerous TV commercials including some for Alka-Seltzer and Dole pineapple.

Her last voice-acting role was the voice of Winnie Werewolf for the animated TV film Scooby-Doo and the Ghoul School which aired posthumously in 1988.

Filmography

Films

Television

Live-action

Death
Schreffler began feeling ill in 1987, initially believing it was due to chronic stomach issues she had been dealing with since adolescence. After losing weight rapidly, she consulted doctors, and was diagnosed with late stage liver cancer. She chose not to seek chemotherapy treatment, as the cancer had metastasized by then, instead deciding on pallative care and work until her health declined too much. Her last role would be in Scooby Doo and the Ghoul School, released months after her death, with Schreffler allegedly recording her lines from her home as she was too ill to travel to the studio.  She died on January 7, 1988, at the age of 42 from a colorectal infection caused by the disease in Los Angeles, California.

References

External links
 
 
 Marilyn Schreffler at Voice Chasers

1945 births
1988 deaths
American voice actresses
American television actresses
Actresses from Kansas
Deaths from liver cancer
Deaths from cancer in California
20th-century American actresses
Hanna-Barbera people